Anthony Lamar King (born 22 January 1985) is an American-born, naturalised Cypriot professional basketball player for Apollon Limassol of the Cypriot League.

He represented Cyprus' national basketball team at the EuroBasket 2017 qualification, where he was his team's best rebounder and shot blocker.

See also
 List of NCAA Division I men's basketball players with 13 or more blocks in a game

References

External links
 FIBA profile
 ESPN profile
 Eurobasket.com profile

1985 births
Living people
American expatriate basketball people in Cyprus
American expatriate basketball people in Germany
American expatriate basketball people in Turkey
American men's basketball players
Aris B.C. players
Artland Dragons players
Basketball players from North Carolina
Centers (basketball)
Cypriot men's basketball players
Cypriot people of African-American descent
Cypriot expatriate basketball people in Germany
Cypriot expatriate basketball people in Turkey
Gaziantep Basketbol players
Keravnos B.C. players
Köln 99ers players
Miami Hurricanes men's basketball players
Power forwards (basketball)
Skyliners Frankfurt players
Sportspeople from Durham, North Carolina